Charlottenberg is a municipality in the district of Rhein-Lahn, in Rhineland-Palatinate, in western Germany. It belongs to the association community of Diez.

References 

Rhein-Lahn-Kreis